Arnold Schmitz (11 July 1893 – 1 November 1980) was a German musicologist who was particularly concerned with Beethoven.

Life 
From 1946 he taught at the University of Mainz, whose rector he was in 1953/54 and 1960/61. In 1973, the Beethoven House in Bonn appointed him an honorary member for his Beethoven research.

Schmitz died in Mainz at age 87.

Publications 
Books
 Beethovens "zwei Prinzipe", Berlin: Ferdinand Dümmler, 1923 
 Unbekannte Skizzen und Entwürfe, Beethoven, Ludwig van, Bonn: Beethovenhaus, 1924 
 Das romantische Beethoven-Bild. Darstellung und Kritik, Berlin: Ferdinand Dümmler, 1927 
 Beethoven, Bonn a. Rh.: Buchgemeinde, 1927 
 "Zur Frage nach Beethovens Weltanschauung und ihrem muskalischen Ausdruck" in Beethoven und die Gegenwart : Festschrift d. Beethovenhauses Bonn, Ludwig Schiedermair zum 60. Geburtstag (also editor), Berlin : Ferdinand Dümmler, 1937 
 Die Bildlichkeit der wortgebundenen Musik Johann Sebastian Bachs, Mainz : Schott, 1950 
 Ausgewählte Aufsätze zur geistlichen Musik, Paderborn : Ferdinand Schöningh, 1996 

Sheet music
 Oberitalienische Figuralpassionen des 16. Jahrhunderts, Mainz : Schott, 1955 (Choral part).

References

Further reading 
 Thomas Phleps: "Ein stiller, verbissener und zäher Kampf um Stetigkeit – Musikwissenschaft in NS-Deutschland und ihre vergangenheitspolitische Bewältigung", in Isolde v. Foerster et al. (ed.), Musikforschung – Nationalsozialismus – Faschismus, Mainz 2001, . 
 Helmut Loos, "Gegen den Strom der Zeit. Der Musikwissenschaftler Arnold Schmitz (1893–1980)", in Musikgeschichte in Mittel- und Osteuropa, No. 13, pp. 233–244, Leipzig 2013
 

Beethoven scholars
20th-century German musicologists
1893 births
1980 deaths
Writers from Metz
Academic staff of the University of Bonn
Academic staff of the University of Breslau
Academic staff of Johannes Gutenberg University Mainz